&10 is the third studio album by South Korean duo Davichi. The album was digitally released on January 25, 2018, with the physical release following the same day. "Days Without You" (너 없는 시간들) served as the promotional single, with Wanna One's Kang Daniel starring in the music video. This album also marks Davichi's 10th anniversary since debut.

Background
On December 14, 2017 Davichi were reported to be returning with a full-length album in January 2018. According to reports, Davichi were busy preparing for their year-end concert 'La eve - Davichi Concert' and also recording tracks of the album when they had time. On December 21, it was reported that Kang Daniel of boygroup Wanna One would star in Davichi's upcoming comeback music video. This would be his second time acting in an MV following Wanna One's "Beautiful". On January 16, 2018 B2M Entertainment confirmed that Davichi's third studio album would be released on January 25.

Promotions
Promotions for "Days Without You" on South Korea's television music programs began on the January 25, 2018 broadcast of M! Countdown. On January 26, Davichi released their first-ever reality show called "Davichi Chord" on the online platform Dingo.

Track listing

Chart performance

Album chart

Sales and certifications

Release history

References

Davichi albums
2018 albums
Korean-language albums
Stone Music Entertainment albums